Clinton-Colden Lake is the ninth largest lake in the Northwest Territories, Canada. It is about 90 miles north of the eastern tip of the Great Slave Lake. George Back reached it in 1834.

See also
List of lakes in the Northwest Territories

References

Lakes of the Northwest Territories